Hester Goodsell (born 27 June 1984) is a British rower  and music teacher.

Rowing career
Goodsell rowed in the Women's Lightweight Double Sculls at the 2008 Summer Olympics.

She was part of the British squad that topped the medal table at the 2011 World Rowing Championships in Bled, where she won a bronze medal as part of the lightweight double sculls with Sophie Hosking.

Personal life
She graduated in music from the University of York.  Until 2010, she was Director of Music at the Elvian School in Reading, Berkshire. She is now Director of Music at Notting Hill and Ealing High School in West London.

References

1984 births
Living people
English female rowers
British female rowers
Rowers at the 2008 Summer Olympics
Olympic rowers of Great Britain
World Rowing Championships medalists for Great Britain